Veerana is a 1988 Indian Hindi-language erotic supernatural horror thriller film, directed by the Ramsay Brothers. The music was composed by Bappi Lahiri and sung by Suman Kalyanpur, Munna Aziz and Sharon Prabhakar.

Plot
  
Priests surround a young boy tied up inside a cage in a large cave. He pleads with them to spare him and asks what they want from him. A priest says that his blood and flesh will give life to Nakita. Just then a lovely young woman enters the cage. She removes the bat locket from her neck, transforms into a ferocious looking witch and kills the boy.

Thakur Mahender Pratap Singh Ahmed finds out that a witch Nakita is creating havoc in an adjoining forest. One night, his little daughter comes to him and says that villagers have got a dead body outside. He goes and sees the corpse of an unknown boy, the villagers are surrounding him. When asked they say that a woman roaming in the lonely lanes of the forest has done this. They call her a witch. His younger brother, Sameer, says that witches and demons are just superstitions. But one man says that some years ago when he came to the village from a nearby city, he lost his way and wandered off into the jungle where he saw a young girl. She later turned into a bat and attacked him.

Mahendra Pratap decides to investigate for himself. Sameer Pratap decides to go on a witch hunt. His wife Preeti tries to dissuade him by saying that he should think of his daughter and niece. Just then they go downstairs and Mahendra Pratap says that he trusts his brother and their ancestors have always helped needy people to get justice. He gifts an "OM" to his brother and wishes him good luck while giving his blessings. As Sameer is passing through the forest, while driving his car he meets a beautiful young woman, just as one villager had described. The woman gets a ride in Sameer's car. They arrive at the old mansion which is located behind a lake in the forest. Sameer cleverly uses his seductive tactics and gets her into the bathtub. Diverting her attention, he snatches the bat locket from her neck. The lady transforms into the hideous witch Nakita that she really is. Sameer renders her weak and helpless by holding a holy Om in front of her. The witch is taken to the outskirts of the village and the locals, on the orders of the Thakur, hang her to death. A tantric, Baba, manages to steal her body along with his followers in the dead of the night, and takes it to the shrine, where he keeps it in a sarcophagus and promises to provide her a new body. The body would be of Thakur Mahendra Pratap's daughter.

Some days pass off happily and peacefully, with the brothers sharing merry hours together and their respective children, Jasmin and Sahila, being lovingly nurtured by Preeti, who is the mother of Sahila and wife of Sameer and loves the brother-in-law's daughter equally.

In the wee hours, Sameer is going to Mussoorie to drop his niece, Jasmin, at her boarding school. When they're crossing the lonely stretch of the forest, the car overheats and stops. He asks his little girl to wait in the car for him and leaves to fetch some water for the radiator. However, Baba suddenly creeps out from behind a bush, hypnotises the girl, and by cutting a piece of her frock and few strands of her hair makes a doll from it. He then places the glass bottle holding this doll in the witch's sarcophagus. A hypnotised Jasmin gets out of the car and walks over to the shrine. Meanwhile, Sameer returns with the water tin and is shocked not to find the child in the car. He follows her trail and is astonished to find himself going off deep inside the forbidden bushy path. The girl walks inside the demon's lair and stands in front of the witch's tomb. The witch reaches out and pulls the kid inside with her. The uncle tries to save the girl but is too late, as the witch's evil spirit already manages to enter the girl's body. Soon, the uncle is captured and killed by Baba's men. 

Baba then brings Jasmin back to her dad Thakur's mansion. The tantric informs Mahendra's family about the death of his brother due to a violent storm in the forest and informs that Sameer's dead body drifted away in the river and could not be recovered. After taking the child back to her room and putting her to sleep, Bade Thakur Saab leaves 2–3 servants in charge of the child and goes downstairs to meet the Baba. Baba asks for the Thakur's permission to leave but Thakur requests that he stay back as the caretaker of his daughter, since he has saved his child's life. However, Preeti gradually notices a difference in Jasmin's behaviour. Preeti talks to her brother-in-law regarding the weird changes in his daughter and tries to convince him to get some witch-doctor to treat Jasmin. However, the witch, who's possessed the child, overhears this and kills Preeti in Jasmin's bedroom that very night. Thakur, horrified by this incident, then decides to send his little niece Sahila, the newly orphaned child, to Mumbai to stay with her grandmother so that she can be safe and stay protected from the ominous situations.

After 12 years, the Thakur receives a letter from his Sahila. He's very happy with the fact that she ranked first in her inter-mediate examinations. During the time that has passed, Jasmine grows up into a stunningly beautiful young girl who spends most of her time alone locked inside her bedroom or occasionally wandering into the wilderness. She tends to be moody and lost in her own world, making her father worry all the time. Thakur saab informs Baba that his niece has topped her exams and he's planning to call her  to spend her summer vacation at his mansion. Baba directs one of his faithful servants Zimbaru to kidnap Sahila so that she would not reach her ancestral home. On the other side, a man attacks Sahila's car and chases after her. Her second cousin Satish shouts for help. Hemant turns up to rescue the damsel in distress. He manages to send the monster packing and saves Sahila. Back at the village, Jasmine meets a new young man at the city petrol station who is a mechanics professional and repairs her car expertly. She is impressed by him and asks him to come over to the old mansion behind the lake that night. When the man reaches there, she welcomes him and they both drink and dine together. While intoxicated, he forces himself on Jasmine. Around midnight, the man gains consciousness and is stunned to see Jasmine's eyes all grey and the girl not moving her eyelids at all. He tries to run away but again falls on the bed. Then the girl wakes up, the witch taking control of her, takes a silver dagger and stabs the man to death. Then Jasmine hastily returns home in the darkness. His body is found by the police next morning but as no one recognises him, the investigation is stalled. Hemant and Sahila get close to each other during the journey and they both reach the Haveli together. Thakur Saab is very happy to see Sahila and when he hears the story of how she was helped out of the tight spot by Hemant, gets impressed by the handsome and burly young boy and readily gives him a job in the timber factory. He also accepts Hemant as his son and family member.

However, murders continue. One evening, Jasmine takes a lift in a drunk man's car and then, after crossing some distance, the witch's spirit kills the man by tearing through his neck. One night, Sahila decides to sleep by Jasmine in their old bedroom and she suddenly notices something very strange and frightening in her cousin and informs her uncle and Hemant. Thakur decides to send his daughter Jasminefor a psychiatric evaluation to his old friend who is a noted psychiatrist. Under hypnosis, Jasmine recounts the incident in her past and she transforms into a completely different person. Her voice changes and she threateningly vows to kill everybody from Thakur's family. Thakur firstly refuses to believe the doctor, but when he hears the recording by the doctor, he believes him when he informs about his daughter being possessed. However, due to their family relation friendship, the doctor promises to stay and treat the young girl. The doctor also asks Hemant to pretend to be close to Jasmine so that the truth comes to light but they both fail in their attempts. However, one night, on seeing weird shadows and smoke coming out of Jasmine's bedroom, the doctor walks inside and sees the witch's grossly frightening face. He tries to warn Thakur but he refuses to believe him. The doctor runs away from the house to save his life but is mocked at by the servant, Raghu while departing from the mansion. In a huff, the doctor shuns Raghu and leaves from the Haveli as Jasmine looks at him with a strange victorious smile on her face standing in the balcony.

While the doctor is driving his car at a breakneck speed through the old village lanes, he takes a wrong turn in confusion, bangs on a tree and stops right in the middle of the lonely forest. The witch, who is lying in wait for him, suddenly comes out from the shadows and while the doctor is barely conscious to look at her with wide shocked eyes, pierces his body and brutally kills him.

The servant Raghu is the next to die. He is killed when out of the witch's fear he decides to sleep in the factory at night instead of going to the haveli. Then Hemant and Sahila while discussing the killings with Satish, bring out the topic of Baba. Hemant decides to follow the Baba along with Sahila on a hunch. They both chase him to the Veerana. But they get captured and Sahila discovers that her father Sameer Pratap is alive. Satish Shah, in a twist of events, reaches the Veerana and rescues all of them. Now, Sameer goes straight home to his brother with the youngsters. Thakur Saab is thrilled to see his dear brother hale and hearty. Then Sahila and Hemant relate the story of Baba's plots and Sameer informs his brother of the plan that helped the Baba make the witch's evil spirit possess Jasmine and turn her into a living nightmare.

In the meantime, Baba plans to kill Jasmine on new moon day so that the witch can be reborn and attain immortality. He takes her from the haveli to the devil's lair and prepares her for the ritual. But the family manages to reach the scene. Jasmine is saved by making the witch leave her body by destroying the bottle containing her voodoo doll. But, by sheer bad luck, Bade Thakur Saab loses his life to grant his daughter happiness and a long survival. The family briefly grieves and, as now the witch has got her spirit back in her own foul body, they succeed in locking the witch inside sarcophagus with the help of the holy Om and Baba is also killed.

Then the Thakur family and all the villagers take the sarcophagus to the temple of Lord Shiva. The sarcophagus is carried inside the temple and Chhote Thakur unlocks it with Hemant's help. Both girls are sent out of the temple. The witch comes out of the sarcophagus and to her horror finds herself in front of the holy Lord. She writhes in pain, tries to run away, but loses all her power and falls to the ground. Within seconds, she burns away and is destroyed. The surviving Thakurs and Hemant begin their life anew.

Cast

Jasmin Dhunna as Jasmin M. Pratap
Hemant Birje as Hemant, Sahila's boyfriend
Sahila Chadha as Sahila S. Pratap
Kulbhushan Kharbanda as Thakur Mahendra Pratap
Satish Shah  as Hitcock
Vijayendra Ghatge as Sameer Pratap (as Vijendra)
Gulshan Grover as servant Raghu
Rama Vij as Preeti S. Pratap, wife of Sameer Pratap
Rajesh Vivek as Baba, the wicked sorcerer
Leela Mishra as Sameer's mother-in-law
Vijay Arora as mechanic and petrol pump worker.
Narendra Nath as doctor uncle, Psychiatrist
Tina Ghai as Jasmin's governess
Rajendra Nath as the Manager of Thakela Guest House
Bhushan Tiwari as Villager 
Vaishnavi Mahant as Young Jasmine
Kamal Roy as the Real witch Nakita, main antagonist
K. K. Raj as Police Inspector, investigating the body of Mechanic and Petrol Pump Owner.

Music

Remake
In 2013, Ramsay brothers announced the remake of Veerana in 3D.

References

Why is Veerana Still Popular?

External links
 

1988 films
1980s Hindi-language films
Films scored by Bappi Lahiri
Indian horror films
1988 horror films
Hindi-language horror films
Films directed by Shyam Ramsay
Films directed by Tulsi Ramsay